Mariusz Fyrstenberg and Marcin Matkowski were the defending champions and they won in the final 6–3, 5–7, [10–8] Colin Fleming and Ken Skupski.

Seeds

Main draw

Draw

References
 Main Draw

Doubles
Aegon International - Men's Doubles